Dulantha Sumathipala (born 3 May 1997) is a Sri Lankan cricketer. He made his Twenty20 debut on 8 January 2020, for Nugegoda Sports and Welfare Club in the 2019–20 SLC Twenty20 Tournament.

References

External links
 

1997 births
Living people
Sri Lankan cricketers
Nugegoda Sports and Welfare Club cricketers 
Place of birth missing (living people)